1932 in philosophy

Events

Publications 
 Henri Bergson, The Two Sources of Morality and Religion (1932)
 George Herbert Mead, The Philosophy of the Present (1932)
 David Eder, The Myth of Progress (1932) 
 Jacques Maritain, The Degrees of Knowledge (1932)
 Karl Jaspers, Philosophy (1932)
 Jean Piaget, The Moral Judgment of the Child (1932)

Philosophical literature 
 Hermann Broch, The Sleepwalkers (1932)

Births 
 January 4 - Paul Virilio
 January 5 - Umberto Eco (died 2016)
 July 31 - John Searle 
 September 10 - David Gauthier 
 October 11 - Dana Scott 
 November 15 - Alvin Plantinga

Deaths

References 

Philosophy
20th-century philosophy
Philosophy by year